Lophiotoma brevicaudata is a species of sea snail, a marine gastropod mollusk in the family Turridae, the turrids.

Description
The length of the shell varies between 16 mm and 24 mm.

The shell is concavely shouldered, forming a somewhat multispiral spire, sharply ridged throughout. The two ridges form the shoulder more prominent ; yellowish to brownish. The ridges are dark chestnut.

Distribution
This marine species occurs off Papua New Guinea, Queensland, Australia and the Philippines.

References

 Adams, H. & Adams, A. 1853. The genera of Recent Mollusca arranged according to their organization. London : John Van Voorst Vol. 1(Parts I-VIII) pp. 1-256, pls 1-32
 Macandrew, R. 1870. Report on the testaceous Mollusca obtained during a dredging excursion in the Gulf of Suez in the months of February and March 1869. Annals and Magazine of Natural History 4 6: 429-450
 Brazier, J. 1876. A list of the Pleurotomidae collected during the Chevert expedition, with the description of the new species. Proceedings of the Linnean Society of New South Wales 1: 151–162

External links
  Reeve, L. A. (1843-1846). Monograph of the genus Pleurotoma. In: Conchologia Iconica, or, illustrations of the shells of molluscous animals
 Puillandre N., Fedosov A.E., Zaharias P., Aznar-Cormano L. & Kantor Y.I. (2017). A quest for the lost types of Lophiotoma (Gastropoda: Conoidea: Turridae): integrative taxonomy in a nomenclatural mess. Zoological Journal of the Linnean Society. 181: 243-271

brevicaudata